The Syrian Communist Party (Unified), initially known simply as the Syrian Communist Party, is a communist party in Syria. The party emerged from a split in the Syrian Communist Party in 1986, formed by the pro-Perestroika faction led by Yusuf Faisal.

At the time of the 2000 Damascus Spring, the party was able to publish a newspaper called an-Nour ("The Light").

The 11th party congress, held in March 2011, re-elected Hanin Nimir as First Secretary of the party.

Electoral results

References

External links 

 Syrian Communist Party (Unified) Website
 Al-nour Newspaper website
 Syrian Communist Party (Unified) Official Facebook Page

1986 establishments in Syria
Communist parties in Syria
Political parties established in 1986
Political parties in Syria
International Meeting of Communist and Workers Parties